Kuli is a rural locality (a selo) in Kulinsky District, Republic of Dagestan, Russia. The population was 3,946 as of 2010. There are 19 streets.

Geography 
Kuli is located 8 km southeast of Vachi (the district's administrative centre) by road. Sumbatl and Khosrekh are the nearest rural localities.

Nationalities 
Laks live there.

Famous residents 
 Khalid Murachuyev (police lieutenant, Hero of the Russian Federation)
 Kurban Gammatsayev (commodity expert, professor)

References 

Rural localities in Kulinsky District